Károly Graszl (born 8 January 1985, in Balatonlelle) is a Hungarian football player who currently plays for Gyirmót SE.

References
Player profile at HLSZ 

1985 births
Living people
Hungarian footballers
Association football defenders
Kaposvári Rákóczi FC players
BFC Siófok players
Nea Salamis Famagusta FC players
Gyirmót FC Győr players
Nemzeti Bajnokság I players
Hungarian expatriate footballers
Expatriate footballers in Cyprus
Hungarian expatriate sportspeople in Cyprus
Cypriot First Division players